This is a list of public holidays in Chad.

December 1, "Freedom and Democracy Day", remembers December 1, 1990 and celebrates the ascent of President Idriss Déby to power.

March 8 is celebrated as "International Women's Day"—La Journee Internationale de la Femme—and marks the culmination of a national week of activities (la Semaine Nationale de la Femme Tchadienne, or "SENAFET") celebrating women.  Observations of "huit mars", as it is known locally in French, vary from town to town, ranging from small ceremonies or a day off school for girls only to a week of events that includes races, contests and expositions by women’s groups and ends with parades and community-wide celebrations.

References

Chadian culture
Chad
Holidays
Chad